Columbia County Schools may refer to:

Columbia County School District, in Lake City, Florida
Columbia County School System, in Evans, Georgia